Malcolm Gordon may refer to:

 Malcolm Gordon (fighter) (born 1990), Canadian mixed martial artist
 Malcolm Gordon (ice hockey) (1868–1964), American ice hockey coach
 Malcolm Gordon School (former), Garrison, New York, founded by the hockey player